Rangoli is an Indian music television series which airs on DD National every Sunday morning. The word literally means a decoration of colors. The show is produced by Doordarshan. A few seasons were also produced by Creative Eye Limited. Same language subtitling is used in the show to improve literacy in rural areas.

History

Rangoli first aired in 1988 and was widely watched in the 1990s. It was popular even outside India, especially in places like the Middle East or the United States, which had a large number of people of Indian origin.

In 1997, both Chitrahaar and Rangoli went back to private producers, with Chitrahaar going to Amit Khanna of Plus Channel and Rangoli to Dheeraj Kumar of Creative Eye.

In 2014, it became the highest rated programme with the highest TVM - 4, during the 8.00 am to 9.00 am slot on Sunday creating a record.

During its first few seasons, the show was hosted by Bollywood actress Hema Malini. The show was also hosted by television actress Shweta Tiwari, Prachi Shah and Neetu Chandra. In July 2019, the show was hosted by Surveen Chawla. Since August 2019, Madhoo is hosting the show.

Hosts
 Hema Malini
 Sharmila Tagore
 Mayuri Kango
 Inder Kumar 
 Prachi Shah
 Jaya Bhattacharya
 Shweta Tiwari
 Sara Khan
 Swara Bhaskar
 Neetu Chandra
 Surveen Chawla
 Hrishitaa Bhatt
 Madhoo

See also 
 List of programs broadcast by DD National

References 

Indian music chart television shows
Hindi-language television shows
DD National original programming
1980s Indian television series
1990s Indian television series
2000s Indian television series
2010s Indian television series
1982 Indian television series debuts
Indian musical television series